Best of Bee Gees is a 1969 compilation album by the English-Australian rock band Bee Gees. It was their first international greatest hits album. It featured their singles from 1966-1969 with the exception of the band's 1968 single "Jumbo".

History
The following songs in this compilation from 1966-1969 were very popular worldwide and were picked up by many casual fans who owned no other Bee Gees album. The compilation includes the US singles "Holiday" and "I Started a Joke." However, the 1968 song "Jumbo" that was also released as a single was not included. This was the first LP appearance of "Words" and first LP appearance outside North America of "I've Gotta Get a Message to You." Both songs were presented in stereo on the Atco version and in mono elsewhere. Many fans consider the songs from Bee Gees' 1st to sound better here than on the original album.

Release
With the release of this compilation, Robin Gibb had left the group after the previous release, Odessa, and this compilation was released while the remaining Bee Gees worked on their next album, Cucumber Castle. Guitarist Vince Melouney, although playing guitar on most of the tracks, is not pictured on the front or back cover as he had departed the group a year earlier. The cover of the album features only the four members and was taken in early 1967 before Melouney joined the band. The back cover is from the winter of 1968-1969. The original 1969 vinyl release included the Bee Gees' 1966 Australian top ten hit "Spicks and Specks", but due to licensing issues with Festival Records in Australia, the group's 1969 hit "Tomorrow Tomorrow" was substituted on the Polydor CD release. The album is noted by fans for its bad stereo mix of the song "Words", which increased the vocals so much that the percussion was lost in the background. This is the only album/CD with this mix. All future compilations have a more balanced stereo mix.

The first issue in Germany was in August 1969, and had the song "Please Read Me" on the disc by mistake where "I Can't See Nobody" belongs. This was fixed a month later.

With the release of Their Greatest Hits: The Record in 2001, this CD went out of print for several years until Rhino reissued it in November 2008 with the same tracks as the Polydor CD. Three of the thirteen tracks from the combined vinyl/CD Best of Bee Gees do not appear amongst the forty seven tracks on Their Greatest Hits: The Record: "I Can't See Nobody" and "Every Christian Lion Hearted Man Will Show You" had only actually been the B-sides of other hits on Best of Bee Gees, while "Tomorrow, Tomorrow" had charted but had never reached the top 20 in the charts of the UK, USA nor Australia.

Legacy
In October 2010, it was listed at No. 16 in the book, 100 Best Australian Albums.

Noel Gallagher commented that Best of Bee Gees is one of his favourite albums and that it inspired the cover art of his band High Flying Birds' greatest hits album, Back the Way We Came: Vol. 1 (2011–2021).

Track listing
All songs written by Barry, Robin & Maurice Gibb except where noted.

Personnel
 Barry Gibb — Lead vocals (1, 2, 4, 6-8 & 10), backing vocals (5, 6 & 9), acoustic guitar, electric guitar
 Robin Gibb — Lead vocals (1-3, 5, 9 & 10), backing vocals (10 & 12)
 Maurice Gibb — Bass guitar, acoustic guitar, electric guitar, piano, organ, mellotron, harpsichord, backing vocals
 Colin Petersen — drums
 Vince Melouney — electric guitar, lead guitar

Chart performance

References

1969 greatest hits albums
Bee Gees compilation albums
Polydor Records compilation albums
Albums produced by Maurice Gibb
Albums produced by Robin Gibb
Albums produced by Robert Stigwood
Atco Records compilation albums
Albums produced by Barry Gibb
Albums recorded at IBC Studios